Sidney Johnson Pauly (born July 23, 1933) is an American politician in the state of Minnesota. She served in the Minnesota House of Representatives. She has nine grandchildren and two great grandchildren.

References

Women state legislators in Minnesota
Republican Party members of the Minnesota House of Representatives
1933 births
Living people
21st-century American women